Siddhi Narasimha Malla, also known as Siddhinarasimha or Siddhi Narasingh,  was a Malla dynasty king and the King of Patan. He was a religious king and ruled as the King of Patan from 1619 to 1661.

Background of Patan 
After the division of Kathmandu Valley into three kingdoms of Kantipur, Patan, and Bhadgaon, Patan was ruled by the feudal lords called pramanas. In around 1697, Shivasimha Malla, grandfather of Siddhinarasimha and Laxmi Narasimha Malla, annexed Patan which was then ruled by Purandarsimha, the son of Vishnusimha.

Sivasimha Malla installed his son Hariharsimha as the governor of Patan. Hariharsimha died shortly afterwards, and he was succeeded by his eldest son Siddhinarasimha In 1619, when Shivasimha Malla died Siddhinarasimha declared Patan independent from Kantipur.

Reign 
Siddhinarasima Malla's reign is generally considered one of the finest among the kings of Patan. Patan was on excellent terms with many neighboring kingdoms such as the Gorkha Kingdom which was then ruled by Ram Shah. The two kingdoms had an agreement to have a joint successor if any one of them die without a male heir. He also maintained friendly relations with the kingdoms in Terai as his wife Bhanumati was from the region of Terai. He had maintained an agreement with Kantipur such that the merchants from Patan could trade in Lhasa and had a similar arrangement with Gorkha.

Relations with Kantipur started to deteriorate after Pratap Malla became its king. Pratap Malla, unlike his father, did not like the idea of Patan being independent from Kantipur and laid several attacks against Patan.

Siddhinarasimha educated his son Srinivasa Malla from his early age on ruling a kingdom. This may partly be because of Siddhinarasimha's desires to retire gradually from being a monarch to devoting himself to religious activities. Srinivasa jointly handled administrative responsibilities with his father from 1641.

Religious works 
Siddhinarasimha was an extremely religious king and lived a disciplined life. He was a Hindu but had a liberal outlook on all religions. He also built several temples such as the Krishna Mandir in 1636. He ritually performed Koti Hom (sacrificial ceremony), and wrote devotional songs in Maithili. He also renovated many temples built by the early Malla kings.

He made it customary for the people returning from Lhasa to undergo a purification process. In 1652, he went on a two years pilgrimage to India.

Death 
In 1657, he abdicated as the King and went on a religious exile. He lived on the banks of Ganges and in his last years went to Vanarasi where died in 1661.

References 

17th-century Nepalese people
Nepalese monarchs
1661 deaths